The Back River, formerly Back's River (Dogrib: Thlewechodyeth, Inuktitut: Haningayok, or Great Fish River), is the 20th longest Canadian river and is located in the Northwest Territories and Nunavut. It rises at an unnamed lake in the North Slave Region of the Northwest Territories and flows more than  mostly through the Kivalliq Region, Nunavut, to its mouth at the Arctic Ocean in the Kitikmeot Region of Nunavut.

Course

It flows over the Muskox Rapids, takes in the left tributary Contwoyto River, and heads east through the Heywood Range. The Back River heads over the Malley Rapids, takes in the left tributary Siorak River and enters the long lake-expansion Lake Beechey in a southeast direction. It heads east, takes in the right tributary Baillie River, left tributary Warren River, right tributary Jervoise River, passes over the Hawk Rapids, takes in the right tributary McKinley River and right tributary Consul River. Between the Baillie and Consul Rivers, the Back River forms the northern border of the Thelon Wildlife Sanctuary. It flows east through, in immediate succession: Upper Garry Lake, where it takes in the right tributary Morse River; Garry Lake; Lower Garry Lake; Buliard Lake; Upper MacDougall Lake; and Lower MacDougall Lake. The Back River then heads over the Rock Rapids, Sinclair Falls, Escape Rapids, Sandhill Rapids, and Wolf Rapids, and takes in the right tributary Meadowbank River. The river curves around Mount Meadowbank, takes in the right tributary Hermann River and left tributary Montresor River, passes McKay Peak, heads over the Whirlpool Rapids, and reaches Franklin Lake. It continues northeast, takes in the right tributary Mistake River, passes north into Kitikmeot Region, takes in the right tributary Hayes River and reaches its mouth at Cockburn Bay on Chantrey Inlet on the Arctic Ocean.

Watershed

Like the Coppermine, Hood, Dubawnt or Kazan, which are other large rivers in this part of Canada, it is navigable only by experienced canoeists because of the numerous and challenging 83 rapids.

The entire river is above the tree line.

History
The Back River is the historic homeland of the Haningayogmiut (or Hanningajurmiut) Copper Inuit, also referred to as the Ualininmiut by their Caribou Inuit northern neighbours, the Utkusiksalinmiut. The Kaernermiut (also Kainermiut) and the southerly Ahiagmiut of the Copper Inuit also frequented this area. The Back River and Thelon River were also the northern and northeastern edges of the tribal territories of the enemy Yellowknives and Chipewyan to the south.

Its first exploration by Europeans was led by George Back in 1834, as part of an expedition initially mounted to seek the 1829 expedition of Captain John Ross. Back learned of the river from local guides, and throughout his memoir of the expedition he referred to the river as the "Thlew-ee-cho-dezeth", which he translated as "Great Fish River". Later 19th-century explorers habitually referred to the river as "Back's Great Fish River", but gradually this was shortened to "Back River" over time.

On abandoning their ships to the ice, the remaining members of Sir John Franklin's 1845 expedition to map a Northwest Passage set out for the Back River but did not survive. In search of them, James Anderson and James Stewart of the Hudson's Bay Company descended the river in 1855 to Chantrey Bay and Montreal Island.

After a hiatus of slightly over 100 years, it was again descended in 1962 by two groups. One was a British group of four young men and the other was a group of four young Americans. The British group was led by Robert Cundy, who wrote a book about their descent called Beacon Six, and the Americans were led by Austin Hoyt. The Americans started at the source of the river, Sussex Lake, with two cedar canvas canoes and reached the coast before the British team. Robert Cundy's group started lower down on Beechey Lake and were overtaken by the Americans. The British were paddling three foldup kayaks, one of which was destroyed on the expedition. Both groups filmed the trip and the British film, Beacon Six, was shown on TV by the Canadian Broadcasting Corporation (CBC).

Over the course of 17 months in 1963-1965, anthropologist Jean Briggs did field research with the  Utkusiksalinmiut Inuit living at the opening of Back River and Chantrey Inlet, resulting in her work Never in Anger, as well as helping to compile an Utkuhiksalik dictionary.

Natural history
The area around the river is full of wildlife, with many fish in the river, and caribou, muskoxen, wolves in the area, with occasional sightings of brown bears, wolverines and Arctic hares. Polar bears are also found as the river nears the Arctic Ocean. The Middle Back River Important Bird Area, located on the river in the Pelly Lake to Lower Garry Lake segment, is a significant habitat for Canada geese, the lesser snow goose and other waterfowl.

Like other areas in Northern Canada, Back River is subject to very cold weather and a persistent Arctic wind that gusts up to gale force.

Modern canoeing 

The Back River constitutes a long and difficult voyage, taking over a month of hard work by strong and experienced Arctic (duo) canoeists. The Back is much more challenging than either the Kazan River or the Dubawnt River. Many rapids end in dense "rock gardens" rendering portaging often mandatory. Such portages must be conducted on bare rocks and occasionally unstable boulders. The need for portage is generally lower after a set of rapids known as the "Escape Rapids", thereafter very many rapids (but not all) can be run, as the river becomes less rocky and risky. Water level permitting, two further areas of runable rapids are notable: Sandhill rapids generally navigated on the left bank, Wolf rapids on the right.

Bear spray is recommended as a protection against polar bears on stretches of the river near the Arctic Ocean. Cooking fuel must also be brought in, as the river is above the tree line, and all vegetation is low-lying and not suitable for use as fuel.

The source of the river can be reached by floatplane from Yellowknife, N.W.T. At the end of the trip, a bush plane can be called in from Baker Lake in Nunavut for a landing in a prearranged spot in the tundra. One must make sure that a rigid canoe can be attached to the exterior of the bush plane. If not, a foldable canoe should be used instead of a rigid one.

The river can also be travelled to its end, where a boat tow can be arranged to the Inuit community of Gjoa Haven, which has commercial air service back to Yellowknife. If planning a canoeing trip on the river, due to the weather, it is generally recommended to have navigated Garry Lake by August 8, the mark of the seasonal change to worse weather. It needs to be noted that being windbound can happen at any time. Due to the proximity to the Arctic Circle and the associated cold, any capsizing can easily conclude in hypothermia and death. A spray deck-equipped canoe is strongly recommended both for lakes and rapids.

Tributaries

Hayes River (right)
Mistake River (right)
Hermann River (right)
Meadowbank River (right)
Bullen River (left)
Consul River (right)
McKinley River (right)
Jervoise River (right)
Warren River (left)
Baillie River (right)
Siorak River (left)
Contwoyto River (left)
Icy River (left)

See also
Back River volcanic complex
List of rivers of Nunavut
List of rivers of the Northwest Territories

References

External links

Rivers of Kitikmeot Region
Rivers of Kivalliq Region
Rivers of the Northwest Territories
Geography of North Slave Region